Valerio Zurlini (19 March 1926 – 26 October 1982) was an Italian film director, stage director, and screenwriter.

Biography
During his law studies in Rome, he started working in the theatre. In 1943, he joined the Italian resistance. Zurlini became a member of the Italian Communist Party. He filmed short documentaries in the immediate post-war period and in 1954 directed his first feature film, The Girls of San Frediano, his only comedy. In 1958 together with Leonardo Benvenuti, Piero De Bernardi and Alberto Lattuada Zurlini won the Silver Ribbon for Best Script for Lattuada's Guendalina. Zurlini made his name as a director with his second feature film, Violent Summer (1959), starring Eleonora Rossi Drago and Jean Louis Trintignant.

In 1961 Zurlini filmed Girl with a Suitcase, a successful intimist drama, starring Claudia Cardinale, who became a film star in Italy, and Jacques Perrin, who would become Zurlini's favorite actor. In 1962 Zurlini's film Family Diary earned him the Golden Lion at the Venice Film Festival (it tied with Tarkovsky's Ivan's Childhood). Zurlini had a masterful skill for screen adaptations. Both The Girls of San Frediano and Family Diary were based on Vasco Pratolini's work. Zurlini admired the work of Italian novelist Giorgio Bassani and hoped to adapt his novel The Garden of the Finzi-Continis, which was subsequently directed by Vittorio De Sica in 1971 (see The Garden of the Finzi-Continis (film)).

His 1965 film The Camp Followers was entered into the 4th Moscow International Film Festival where it won the Special Silver Prize.

Zurlini's last film, The Desert of the Tartars (1976), produced by Jacques Perrin and featuring an all-star ensemble, was based on Dino Buzzati's novel of the same name.

In 1977 he was a member of the jury at the 10th Moscow International Film Festival. In the same year, with this film Zurlini, he won both the David di Donatello for Best Director and the Silver Ribbon for Best Director. The visual style of Zurlini's adaptations was informed by Giorgio de Chirico, Giorgio Morandi and Ottone Rosai's paintings. During the last years of his life Zurlini taught at the Centro Sperimentale di Cinematografia in Rome. He died in Verona on 26 October 1982.

After Zurlini's death, his work fell into relative obscurity, but regained popularity in the 2000s after several of his retrospectives were met with success internationally. In 2006, the NoShame Films released The Desert of the Tartars, Violent Summer and Girl With a Suitcase on DVD.

Filmography
The Girls of San Frediano (1954)
Guendalina (1957)
Violent Summer (1959)
Girl with a Suitcase (1961)
Family Diary (1962)
Le soldatesse (1965)
Seduto alla sua destra (1968)
The Professor (a.k.a. Indian Summer) (1972)
The Desert of the Tartars (1976)

References

Further reading
Toffetti, Sergio (a cura di). Valerio Zurlini. Torino: Lindau, 1993.

External links
 

Italian film directors
20th-century Italian screenwriters
Italian male screenwriters
Italian theatre directors
Film people from Bologna
1926 births
1982 deaths
Academic staff of the Centro Sperimentale di Cinematografia
David di Donatello winners
Nastro d'Argento winners
Directors of Golden Lion winners
20th-century Italian male writers